Protestantism is the largest grouping of Christians in the United States, with its combined denominations collectively comprising about 43% of the country's population (or 141 million people) in 2019. Other estimates suggest that 48.5% of the U.S. population (or 157 million people) is Protestant. Simultaneously, this corresponds to around 20% of the world's total Protestant population. The U.S. contains the largest Protestant population of any country in the world. Baptists comprise about one-third of American Protestants. The Southern Baptist Convention is the largest single Protestant denomination in the U.S., comprising one-tenth of American Protestants. Twelve of the original Thirteen Colonies were Protestant, with only Maryland having a sizable Catholic population due to Lord Baltimore's religious tolerance.

The country's history is often traced back to the Pilgrim Fathers whose Brownist beliefs motivated their move from England to the New World. These English Dissenters, who also happened to be Puritans—and therefore—Calvinists, were first to settle in what was to become the Plymouth Colony. America's Calvinist heritage is often underlined by various experts, researchers and authors, prompting some to declare that the United States was "founded on Calvinism", while also underlining its exceptional foundation as a Protestant majority nation. American Protestantism has been diverse from the very beginning with large numbers of early immigrants being Anglican, various Reformed, Lutheran, and also Anabaptist. In the next centuries, it diversified even more with the Great Awakenings throughout the country.

Protestants are divided into many different denominations, which are generally classified as either "mainline" or "evangelical", although some may not fit easily into either category. Some historically African-American denominations are also classified as Black churches. Protestantism had undergone an unprecedented development on American soil, diversifying into multiple branches, denominations, several interdenominational and related movements, as well as many other developments. All have since expanded on a worldwide scale mainly through missionary work.

Statistics

Branches

Calvinism

Baptists 

Baptists are the largest Protestant grouping in the United States accounting for one-third of all American Protestants.

Prior to 1845, most white Baptist churches were loosely affiliated as the Triennial Convention. In that year, most southern congregations left to form a new Southern Baptist Convention, which is now the largest Protestant denomination in the U.S., with 13.7 million members. The remaining members organized what is now American Baptist Churches USA and includes 1.1 million members and 5057 congregations.

African American Baptists, excluded from full participation in white Baptist organizations, have formed several denominations, of which the largest are the National Baptist Convention, with 7.5 million members and the more liberal Progressive National Baptist Convention (PNBC), with over 2000 churches and a total membership of 2.5 million.

There are numerous smaller bodies, some recently organized and others with long histories, such as the Calvinistic Baptists, General Baptists, Primitive Baptists, Old Regulars, Two-Seed-in-the-Spirit Predestinarian Baptists, independents, and Seventh Day Baptists.

Baptists have been present in the part of North America that is now the United States since the early 17th century. Both Roger Williams and John Clarke, his compatriot in working for religious freedom, are credited with founding the Baptist faith in North America. In 1639, Williams established a Baptist church in Providence, Rhode Island (First Baptist Church in America) and Clarke began a Baptist church in Newport, Rhode Island (First Baptist Church in Newport). According to a Baptist historian who has researched the matter, "There is much debate over the centuries as to whether the Providence or Newport church deserved the place of 'first' Baptist congregation in America. Exact records for both congregations are lacking."

Largest Baptist denominations
The Handbook of Denominations in the United States identifies and describes 31 Baptist groups or conventions in the
United States. A partial list follows. (Unless otherwise noted, statistics are taken from the Baptist World Alliance website, and reflect 2006 data.)

 Southern Baptist Convention: 47,614 congregations, 13.7 million members (2021)
 National Baptist Convention, USA, Inc.: 31,000 congregations, 7.5 million members (African-American) (2013)
 National Baptist Convention of America, Inc.: 12,000 congregations, 3.1 million members (African-American)
 Progressive National Baptist Convention: 1,200 congregations, 2.5 million members (African-American)
 Baptist General Convention of Texas: 4,200 congregations, 1.7 million members
 Baptist Bible Fellowship International: 3,400 congregations, 1.4 million members
 American Baptist Churches USA: 5,100 congregations, 1.1 million members

Presbyterian 

 Presbyterian Church (U.S.A.) mainline church has approximately 1,194,000 members and 8,800 congregations. It adopted the Book of Confession which include the Westminster Confession. Headquarters is in Louisville, Kentucky.
 Presbyterian Church in America Evangelical, Calvinist church, adheres to the Westminster Confession of Faith. The denomination has 374,000 members and 1912 congregations and several congregation outside the United States, in Germany, Japan, Cayman Islands, etc. Headquarters is located in Lawrenceville, Georgia.
Evangelical Presbyterian Church (United States) has more than 600 congregations and 145,000 members. Adhere to the Westminster Confession.
Evangelical Reformed Church in America
Orthodox Presbyterian Church was formed in 1936 under the influence of John Gresham Machen, has 31,000 members.
Evangelical Covenant Order, 60,000 members in 357 congregations.
Bible Presbyterian Church
Associate Reformed Presbyterian Church
Free Presbyterian Church in North America
Reformed Presbyterian Church in North America
Cumberland Presbyterian Church
Cumberland Presbyterian Church in America
Free Reformed Church in North America
Reformed Church in America
Christian Reformed Church in North America
Netherlands Reformed Congregations
Hungarian Reformed Church in America

Lutheranism

With 3.0 million members, the Evangelical Lutheran Church in America (ELCA) is the largest American Lutheran denomination, followed by the Lutheran Church–Missouri Synod (LCMS) with 1.8 million members, and the Wisconsin Evangelical Lutheran Synod (WELS) with 344,000 members. The differences between the Evangelical Lutheran Church in America (ELCA) and the Lutheran Church–Missouri Synod (LCMS) largely arise from historical and cultural factors, although some are theological in character. The ELCA tends to be more involved in ecumenical endeavors than the LCMS.

When Lutherans came to North America, they started church bodies that reflected, to some degree, the churches left behind. Many maintained their immigrant languages until the early 20th century. They sought pastors from the "old country" until patterns for the education of clergy could be developed in America. Eventually, seminaries and church colleges were established in many places to serve the Lutheran churches in North America and, initially, especially to prepare pastors to serve congregations.

The LCMS sprang from German immigrants fleeing the forced Prussian Union, who settled in the St. Louis area and has a continuous history since it was established in 1847. The LCMS is the second largest Lutheran church body in North America (1.8 million). It identifies itself as a church with an emphasis on biblical doctrine and faithful adherence to the historic Lutheran confessions. Insistence by some LCMS leaders on a strict reading of all passages of Scripture led to a rupture in the mid-1970s, which in turn resulted in the formation of the Association of Evangelical Lutheran Churches, now part of the ELCA.

Although its strongly conservative views on theology and ethics might seem to make the LCMS politically compatible with other Evangelicals in the U.S., the LCMS as an organization largely eschews political activity, partly out of its strict understanding of the Lutheran distinction between the Two Kingdoms. It does, however, encourage its members to be politically active, and LCMS members are often involved in political organizations such as Lutherans for Life.

The earliest predecessor synod of the Evangelical Lutheran Church in America was constituted on August 25, 1748, in Philadelphia. It was known as the Ministerium of Pennsylvania and Adjacent States. The ELCA is the product of a series of mergers and represents the largest (3.0 million members) Lutheran church body in North America. The ELCA was created in 1988 by the uniting of the 2.85-million-member Lutheran Church in America, 2.25-million-member American Lutheran Church, and the 100,000-member Association of Evangelical Lutheran Churches. The ALC and LCA had come into being in the early 1960s, as a result of mergers of eight smaller ethnically-based Lutheran bodies.

The ELCA, through predecessor church bodies, is a founding member of the Lutheran World Federation, World Council of Churches and the National Council of Churches USA. The LCMS, maintaining its position as a confessional church body emphasizing the importance of full agreement in the teachings of the Bible, does not belong to any of these. However, it is a member of the International Lutheran Council, made up of over 30 Lutheran Churches worldwide that support the confessional doctrines of the Bible and the Book of Concord. The WELS, along with the Evangelical Lutheran Synod (ELS), are part of the international Confessional Evangelical Lutheran Conference (CELC).

Pentecostalism

Pentecostalism is a renewalist religious movement within Protestantism, that places special emphasis on a direct personal experience of God through the baptism of the Holy Spirit. The term Pentecostal is derived from Pentecost, a Greek term describing the Jewish Feast of Weeks. For Christians, this event commemorates the descent of the Holy Spirit and Pentecostals tend to see their movement as reflecting the same kind of spiritual power, worship styles and teachings that were found in the early church.

Pentecostalism is an umbrella term that includes a wide range of different theological and organizational perspectives. As a result, there is no single central organization or church that directs the movement. Most Pentecostals consider themselves to be part of broader Christian groups; for example, most Pentecostals identify as Protestants. Many embrace the term Evangelical, while others prefer Restorationist. Pentecostalism is theologically and historically close to the Charismatic Movement, as it significantly influenced that movement; some Pentecostals use the two terms interchangeably.

Within classical Pentecostalism there are three major orientations: Wesleyan-Holiness, Higher Life, and Oneness. Examples of Wesleyan-Holiness denominations include the Church of God in Christ (COGIC) and the International Pentecostal Holiness Church (IPHC). The International Church of the Foursquare Gospel is an example of the Higher Life branch, while the Assemblies of God (AG) was influenced by both groups. Some Oneness Pentecostal (Nontrinitarian) churches include the United Pentecostal Church International (UPCI) and Pentecostal Assemblies of the World (PAW). Many Pentecostal sects are affiliated with the Pentecostal World Conference.
Assemblies of God, Evangelical

Mainline vs. evangelical

In typical usage, the term mainline is contrasted with evangelical. The distinction between the two can be due as much to sociopolitical attitude as theological doctrine, although doctrinal differences may exist as well. Theologically conservative critics accuse the mainline churches of "the substitution of leftist social action for Christian evangelizing, and the disappearance of biblical theology," and maintain that "All the Mainline churches have become essentially the same church: their histories, their theologies, and even much of their practice lost to a uniform vision of social progress."

The Association of Religion Data Archives (ARDA) counts 26,344,933 members of mainline churches versus 39,930,869 members of evangelical Protestant churches. There is evidence that there has been a shift in membership from mainline denominations to evangelical churches.

As shown in the table below, some denominations with similar names and historical ties to evangelical groups are considered mainline. For example, while the American Baptist Churches, the Evangelical Lutheran Church in America, and the Presbyterian Church (USA) are mainline, the Southern Baptist Convention, Lutheran Church–Missouri Synod, and the Presbyterian Church in America are grouped as evangelical.

Mainline Protestantism

The mainline or mainline Protestant Christian denominations are those Protestant denominations that were brought to the United States by its historic immigrant groups; for this reason they are sometimes referred to as heritage churches.
The largest are the Episcopal (English), Presbyterian (Scottish), Methodist (English and Welsh), and Lutheran (German and Scandinavian) churches.

Many mainline denominations teach that the Bible is God's word in function, but tend to be open to new ideas and societal changes. They have been increasingly open to the ordination of women.
Mainline churches tend to belong to organizations such as the National Council of Churches and World Council of Churches.

Mainline Protestant denominations, such as the Episcopal Church (76%), the Presbyterian Church (U.S.A.) (64%), and the United Church of Christ (46%), have the highest number of graduate and post-graduate degrees per capita of any other Christian denomination in the United States, as well as the most high-income earners.

Episcopalians and Presbyterians tend to be considerably wealthier and better educated than most other religious groups in Americans, and are disproportionately represented in the upper reaches of American business, law and politics, especially the Republican Party. Numbers of the most wealthy and affluent American families as the Vanderbilts and Astors, Rockefeller, Du Pont, Roosevelt, Forbes, Whitneys, Morgans and Harrimans are Mainline Protestantism families.

Evangelicalism

Evangelicalism is a Protestant Christian movement in which adherents consider its key characteristics to be a belief in the need for personal conversion (or being "born again"), some expression of the gospel in effort, a high regard for Biblical authority and an emphasis on the death and resurrection of Jesus. David Bebbington has termed these four distinctive aspects "conversionism", "activism", "biblicism", and "crucicentrism", saying, "Together they form a quadrilateral of priorities that is the basis of Evangelicalism."

Note that the term "evangelical" does not equal Christian fundamentalism, although the latter is sometimes regarded simply as the most theologically conservative subset of the former. The major differences largely hinge upon views of how to regard and approach scripture ("Theology of Scripture"), as well as construing its broader world-view implications. While most conservative evangelicals believe the label has broadened too much beyond its more limiting traditional distinctives, this trend is nonetheless strong enough to create significant ambiguity in the term. As a result, the dichotomy between "evangelical" vs. "mainline" denominations is increasingly complex (particularly with such innovations as the "emergent church" movement).

The contemporary North American usage of the term is influenced by the evangelical/fundamentalist controversy of the early 20th century. Evangelicalism may sometimes be perceived as the middle ground between the theological liberalism of the mainline denominations and the cultural separatism of fundamentalist Christianity. Evangelicalism has therefore been described as "the third of the leading strands in American Protestantism, straddl[ing] the divide between fundamentalists and liberals." While the North American perception is important to understand the usage of the term, it by no means dominates a wider global view, where the fundamentalist debate was not so influential.

Evangelicals held the view that the modernist and liberal parties in the Protestant churches had surrendered their heritage as evangelicals by accommodating the views and values of the world. At the same time, they criticized their fellow fundamentalists for their separatism and their rejection of the Social Gospel as it had been developed by Protestant activists of the previous century. They charged the modernists with having lost their identity as evangelicals and the fundamentalists with having lost the Christ-like heart of evangelicalism. They argued that the Gospel needed to be reasserted to distinguish it from the innovations of the liberals and the fundamentalists.

They sought allies in denominational churches and liturgical traditions, disregarding views of eschatology and other "non-essentials," and joined also with Trinitarian varieties of Pentecostalism. They believed that in doing so, they were simply re-acquainting Protestantism with its own recent tradition. The movement's aim at the outset was to reclaim the evangelical heritage in their respective churches, not to begin something new; and for this reason, following their separation from fundamentalists, the same movement has been better known merely as "Evangelicalism." By the end of the 20th century, this was the most influential development in American Protestant Christianity.

The National Association of Evangelicals is a U.S. agency which coordinates cooperative ministry for its member denominations.

Other themes

Protestantism and American education

According of Scientific Elite: Nobel Laureates in the United States by Harriet Zuckerman, a review of American Nobel prizes winners awarded between 1901 and 1972, 72% of American Nobel Prize laureates have identified from Protestant background. Overall, 84.2% of all the Nobel Prizes awarded to Americans in Chemistry, 60% in Medicine, and 58.6% in Physics between 1901 and 1972 were won by Protestants.

Some of the first colleges and universities in America, including Harvard, Yale, Princeton, Columbia, Brown,  Dartmouth, Rutgers, Williams, Bowdoin, Middlebury, and Amherst, all were founded by  Protestants, as were later Carleton, Duke, Oberlin, Beloit, Pomona, Rollins and Colorado College.

See also

 Black church
 Church property disputes in the United States
 Catholic Church in the United States
 Demography of the United States#Religion
 History of Protestantism in the United States
 History of religion in the United States
 Religion in the United States
 Yearbook of American and Canadian Churches

References

External links
 Map Gallery of Religion in the United States

 
United States